Delaware is a state in the Northeastern United States. Delaware's economy shifted to a manufacturing base in the late 19th century, led by the transformation of the DuPont Company. Modern growth in the financial workforce has overtaken the manufacturing sector in the state's economy. The Delaware General Corporation Law provides a flexible and stable framework for national incorporation. While they are seldom headquartered in the state, the management-friendly and mature legal system attracts many corporations; over 66% of the Fortune 500 are incorporated in Delaware.

Largest firms 
This list shows firms in the Fortune 500, which ranks firms by total revenues reported before January 31, 2018. Only the top five firms (if available) are included as a sample.

Notable firms 
This list includes notable companies with primary headquarters located in the state. The industry and sector follow the Industry Classification Benchmark taxonomy. Organizations which have ceased operations are included and noted as defunct.

See also 
 Corporate haven

References 

Delaware-related lists
Delaware